The Urban Council was an election college created in 1985 Legislative Council election and became one of the functional constituencies between 1991 and 1998 for the Legislative Council of Hong Kong, until the Urban Council and Regional Council were abolished in 1999 and replaced by District Council and Catering.

Legislative Council members

Election results

1990s

1980s

References

Urban Council of Hong Kong
Constituencies of Hong Kong
Constituencies of Hong Kong Legislative Council
1985 establishments in Hong Kong
Constituencies established in 1985